The Hanged Man's House (in French: La maison du pendu, Auvers-sur-Oise) is an 1873 oil on canvas painting by Paul Cézanne. The painting is exhibited at the Musée d'Orsay in Paris.

Background 
The Hanged Man's House was presented at the first Impressionist exhibition in 1874 and was the first painting that Cézanne sold to a collector. The village depicted in the painting is Auvers-sur-Oise, 27 km north of Paris.

Description 
The Hanged Man's House is an oil painting on canvas that measures 55 cm x 66 cm and is signed by Cézanne on the bottom left in red paint. It displays a landscape with a complicated composition. The scene presents an atmosphere of solitude, due to the absence of people and the use of a cool colour palette. From the central point of the painting, there are several axis, including two paths leading to the centre and to the left, a bank on the right and the branches of a tree leading to the top of the painting. Cézanne had been heavily influenced by his friend  Camille Pissarro and as a result, used grainy, broken brushstrokes and pale colours used by the Impressionists. In this composition, Cézanne challenged the conventions of art by making deliberate imperfections of perspective. The inaccuracies can be seen in the angle of the path that leads to the left and the bank on the right.

See also
List of paintings by Paul Cézanne

References

External links
 The Hanged Man's House at Musée d'Orsay

Paintings by Paul Cézanne
1873 paintings
Landscape paintings
Paintings in the collection of the Musée d'Orsay